The Chemistry of Common Life is the second full-length studio album by Canadian hardcore punk band Fucked Up. It was released on October 7, 2008 on Matador Records in CD and double LP formats and on Welfare Records in Reel-to-reel Audio Tapes. The statement on the label's site describes it as "an expansive epic about the mysteries of birth, death, and the origins of life (and re-living)".

The album is named after a book by James F. W. Johnston, which (among other things) describes hallucinogenic properties of mushrooms and plants. The title for the track "The Peaceable Kingdom" is taken from a famous painting by American folk-painter Edward Hicks. The cover art depicts the phenomenon of Manhattanhenge.

The album won the 2009 Polaris Music Prize.

Track listing

The track "The Peaceable Kingdom" - 4:25 is only available on the vinyl (as track 7)/iTunes Music Store releases.
All songs written by the band, except tracks "Golden Seal" written by 10,000 Marbles and Corona, "Royal Swan" written by Mr. Jo with lyrics by 10,000 Marbles, "Twice Born" written by Mr. Jo with lyrics by Pink Eyes and "Looking For God" written by 10,000 Marbles and Corona.

Lineup
 Pink Eyes – vocals
 10,000 Marbles – guitar
 Gulag – guitar
 Young Governor – guitar
 Mustard Gas – bass
 Mr. Jo – drums

References

External links
The Chemistry of Common Life at Matador Records site

2008 albums
Fucked Up albums
Matador Records albums
Polaris Music Prize-winning albums